Greenbush is an unincorporated community in Preble County, in the U.S. state of Ohio.

History
A post office called Greenbush was established in 1852, and remained in operation until 1906. Greenbush was platted in 1861.

References

Unincorporated communities in Preble County, Ohio
Unincorporated communities in Ohio